Jet Link Holland was a cargo airline based in Amsterdam, Netherlands. Its main base was Amsterdam Schiphol Airport.

History
The airline was founded in 1991, but due to the Gulf War, the start of operations was delayed until June 1998. Once the airline started operations, it acquired Airbus A300 aircraft due to their availability and their cargo capability (the airline initially planned to acquire Boeing 757s but finally decided on the A300) to cover their flights to China, the United States and Japan. In August 1998, Jet Link Holland planned to operate flights between Amsterdam, Cairo and Tripoli, but needed coverage, and for this duty created their Egyptian subsidiary Tristar Air in September, which was fitted with one A300 to link Cairo with Amsterdam and Tripoli. In March 2000, Dutch civil aviation authorities found several failures in Jet Link's aircraft overhaul and thus suspended their air operator's certificate (AOC); the airline was declared in bankruptcy in June. The Egyptian subsidiary operated flights between Cairo, Tripoli, and Amsterdam until it too ceased operations in 2015.

Fleet
 2 Airbus A300B4-200F

References

Defunct airlines of the Netherlands
Airlines established in 1991
Airlines disestablished in 2000
Defunct cargo airlines
Cargo airlines of the Netherlands